In the Tradition Volume 2 is an album by American saxophonist and composer Anthony Braxton recorded in 1974 and released on the Danish SteepleChase label in 1976. The album features Braxton's interpretations of jazz standards and followed the first volume recorded at the same sessions which was released in 1974.

Reception
The Allmusic review by Scott Yanow stated "Braxton pays tribute to each song's melody before making his abstract improvisations; the rhythm section mostly ignores what he plays. A short "Duet" (which teams the leader with Pedersen) is a change-of-pace and much freer. These two records are historical curiosities but feature much less interaction between the trio and Anthony Braxton than one would hope".

Track listing
 "What's New?" (Johnny Burke, Bob Haggart) - 9:58
 "Duet" (Anthony Braxton, Niels-Henning Ørsted Pedersen) - 3:30
 "Body and Soul" (Frank Eyton, Johnny Green, Edward Heyman, Robert Sour) - 10:17
 "Marshmallow" (Warne Marsh) - 6:42 Bonus track on CD reissue 		
 "Donna Lee" (Charlie Parker) - 6:35
 "My Funny Valentine" (Lorenz Hart, Richard Rodgers) - 8:07 		
 "Half Nelson" (Miles Davis) - 4:15

Personnel
Anthony Braxton – alto saxophone, contrabass clarinet
Tete Montoliu - piano
Niels-Henning Ørsted Pedersen - bass
Albert “Tootie” Heath - drums

References

SteepleChase Records albums
Anthony Braxton albums
1976 albums